Abdullah Hawsawi (born 1 February 1996) is a Saudi Arabian professional footballer who plays as a right back for Saudi Pro League side Damac.

Career
Hawsawi started his career at the youth team of Al-Wehda. During the 2016–17 season, he moved to Portugal and joined CDP side Louletano. In July 2017, Hawsawi joined Fátima. On 20 July 2019, Hawsawi returned to Saudi and joined MS League side Al-Bukiryah. He made 7 league appearances for the club as Al-Bukiryah finished 4th and missed out on promotion to the Pro League. On 14 October 2020, Hawsawi joined MS League side Al-Nojoom. Following Al-Nojoom's relegation to the Second Division, Hawsawi left the club and joined Pro League side Damac on a two-year contract. He made his debut on 13 August 2021 in the 4–1 defeat to Al-Nassr.

Career statistics

Club

References

External links
 

Living people
1996 births
Association football fullbacks
Saudi Arabian footballers
Al-Wehda Club (Mecca) players
Louletano D.C. players
C.D. Fátima players
Al-Bukayriyah FC players
Al-Nojoom FC players
Damac FC players
Campeonato de Portugal (league) players
Saudi First Division League players
Saudi Professional League players
Saudi Arabian expatriate footballers
Saudi Arabian expatriate sportspeople in Portugal
Expatriate footballers in Portugal